Oloye Akin Alabi  (born 31 March 1977) is a Nigerian politician, entrepreneur, author and philanthropist. He is the author of the best selling business and marketing books, Small Business Big Money and How To Sell To Nigerians. He is the founder of NairaBET.com, Nigeria's first sports betting company. He is the founder and owner of Lekki United F.C.

Akin Alabi is the Mogaji of Ajiwogbo in Ibadan. He was appointed by the Olubadan of Ibadan, HRH Saliu Adetunji on Monday December 5, 2016.

Early life
Born in Ibadan, Ọyọ State, Nigeria, to Chief and Chief (Mrs) Adediran Alabi, Akin completed his primary education at Command Children School, Ibadan, and secondary school education at Federal Government College Enugu.

Education
Akin Alabi holds a Bachelor of Science in politics and international relations from Lead City University, Ibadan, Oyo State of Nigeria.

He also attended The Polytechnic, Ibadan, where he obtained a Higher National Diploma in business administration.

He holds a Masters of Science (Msc) degree in marketing from the University of Liverpool, United Kingdom. In addition, he also holds a certificate in Intellectual Property Strategy from Harvard University, Boston, United States.

Business career
Akin Alabi started his business career in 2003 writing and selling books, manuals and other information products. He then launched his own seminar and training company specializing in teaching and consulting for other young people starting their own small businesses. He also started publishing a business opportunity newspaper titled Income (now rested). To add to his publishing enterprise, Akin launched, World Soccer News, a weekly sports newspaper.

Akin has gone on to build many other businesses from scratch; one of them being NairaBET, Nigeria's first online sports betting portal, with outlets across Nigeria. He got the idea for NairaBET when he visited the United Kingdom and went to a sports betting shop. He created an information manual about it and sold online. The success of the product prompted him to start his own online sports betting platform in Nigeria. Nairabet.com has its headquarters in Lagos with its nationwide operation regulated by the National Lottery Regulatory Commission. NairaBET is Nigeria's first sports betting company.

Akin Alabi is involved in the Nigerian entertainment industry. He is the founder of Nightlife.NG, an online portal that showcases and reports the nightlife industry in Nigeria.

Philanthropic work
Akin Alabi is involved in philanthropic works. He is the founder of Akin Alabi Foundation, a non-governmental, not for profit outfit, aimed at improving the well-being of the average Nigerian. With the motto, "touching lives one person at a time"; the foundation has successfully implemented projects like building and donating classrooms to primary schools, sinking of bore holes in areas where there is scarcity of water, financial empowerment of widows and a free business and career building event called Youth Enterprise Conference, held annually at Eko Hotel and Suites, Victoria Island, Lagos.

Political career
Akin Alabi is a member of the ruling All Progressives Congress (APC). He was once a member of the People's Democratic Party (PDP). He declared his intention to contest for a seat in Nigeria's Federal House of Representatives. On June 20, 2019, Akin Alabi announced that he will be stepping down as CEO of Nairabet to concentrate on his political campaign.
On October 5, 2018, Alabi emerged as the All Progressive Congress House of Representatives candidate for the Egbeda/Ona Ara federal constituency in Oyo State for the 2019 general elections.

Legislative duties
On 25 July 2019 Alabi emerged as chairman, house committee on intergovernmental affairs. The news was announced during the plenary session presided over by the Speaker, Rt Hon Femi Gbajabiamila.

On 6 October 2020 Alabi filed a motion to dissolve the special anti-robbery squad (SARS) of the Nigeria police force. Under the motion he stated that "Policing in Nigeria continues to fall short of modern practices where citizens should be treated with utmost respect and decorum, therefore making it very difficult for an average citizen to truly trust that the police are their friends."

Following the COVID-19 pandemic, University of Lagos (UNILAG) commenced e-learning as a measure to contain its spread. However, this was shortly followed by complaints of high data cost, network issues, inability to access the provided platform, system malfunctions, among others. Having received complaints from students, Alabi filed a motion on the urgent need for UNILAG to review the university's e-learning system. In the motion he noted that the advent of e-learning systems should make learning easier and more interesting and "not to frustrate the students in their efforts or have lecturers completely abandon their duties of educating the students."

On 15 December 2020, notwithstanding the worrisome increase of insecurity on Nigerian roads, Alabi moved a motion to stop the Federal Government from procuring weapons for the Federal Road Safety Corps (FRSC).

In 2020, following the impressive developments Alabi had brought to his community, Egbeda/Ona Ara in areas such as Welfare programs, community support, infrastructure, and human capital development, he was recognised as the Federal Legislator of the year by Nigerian Students Merit Awards. Some of the other programs include the N250m women empowerment scheme, the community support program that builds roads and purchases transformers for communities. The infrastructure program involves the construction of schools and primary health care centres and skills acquisition programs for young people. Alabi has also proposed important bills and motions like the amendment of the administration of Criminal Justice Act, the motion restraining APCON from harassing online businesses, constitution amendment on the transfer of citizenship by female Nigerian citizens  to mention a few.

On 9 November 2021, Alabi moved a motion to curtail the excesses of online loan providers in the country. In his motion he stated that these companies have been operating outside the principles of fair and lawful processing of personal data as required under the Nigeria Data Protection Regulation and called on the Central Bank of Nigeria to provide better regulation for these financial service providers, and for the National Information Technology Development Agency (NITDA) to ensure strict adherence to the Nigerian Data Protection Regulation by all online loan providers.

Personal life
Alabi is a football fan. He is a fan of Shooting Stars Sports Club (3SC) of Ibadan which his company, NairaBET sponsors. He is also a fan of Manchester United FC where he is a season ticket holder. He is married with children.

Social media 
Akin Alabi came under fire on social media after he sponsored a bill to construct a primary health care center in Ajiwogbo, Ibadan.

References

External links
 

Nigerian politicians
Yoruba politicians
Living people
1977 births
People from Ibadan
People from Oyo State
The Polytechnic, Ibadan alumni
Harvard University alumni
Federal Government College Enugu alumni